Sphaerodactylus difficilis,  also known as the Hispaniolan eyespot sphaero or difficult least gecko, is a species of lizard in the family Sphaerodactylidae . It is endemic to Hispaniola.

References

Sphaerodactylus
Endemic fauna of Hispaniola
Reptiles of the Dominican Republic
Reptiles of Haiti
Reptiles described in 1914
Taxa named by Thomas Barbour